Northern Heights High School is a fully accredited public high school located in Allen, Kansas, in the North Lyon County USD 251 school district, serving students in grades 9-12.  The school mascot is the Wildcats and the school colors are black and white.

Extracurricular activities
The Wildcats compete in the Flint Hills League. Northern Heights is in the KSHSAA classification 2A.

Athletics
The Wildcats compete in the Flint Hills League and are classified as a 1A school.
Northern Heights High School offers the following sports:

Fall
 Boys' Cross Country
 Girls' Cross Country
 Fall Cheerleading
 Football
 Volleyball

Winter
 Boys' Basketball
 Girls' Basketball
 Winter Cheerleading

Spring
 Baseball
 Golf 
 Softball
 Boys' Track and Field
 Girls' Track and Field

References

External links
 

Public high schools in Kansas
Schools in Lyon County, Kansas
Educational institutions established in 1958
1958 establishments in Kansas